Clavidisculum is a genus of fungi belonging to the family Hyaloscyphaceae.

The species of this genus are found in Eurasia.

Species:

Clavidisculum caricis 
Clavidisculum cupulinum 
Clavidisculum graminicola 
Clavidisculum humuli 
Clavidisculum incrustatum 
Clavidisculum karstenii 
Clavidisculum kriegerianum 
Clavidisculum microsporum 
Clavidisculum phytolaccae

References

Leotiomycetes genera
Hyaloscyphaceae